The Hotel Grand Chancellor in Launceston, Tasmania, Australia formerly known as the Novotel, is a seven-storey building located in the city's central business district (CBD). Completed in August 1989, the building was constructed at a cost of $44 million, with up to 130 men working on-site. Before the official opening of the hotel, 20,000 locals visited the Chancellor on its open day. Before the late 20th century development, Launceston's hotels and structures were predominantly constructed in the nineteenth century. Robert Hosken proposed the new international hotel in the early 1980s, which he described to be "the biggest commercial development in Launceston's history." He described the facade as "classic Georgian design in the grand European style, with rustic brickwork and rendering." However, many residents thought the architecture was foreign to the rest of the city and sought a more modern and innovative design.

See also
Hotel Grand Chancellor, Hobart

Notes

References

Grand Hotels International
Hotels in Launceston
Hotels established in 1989
Hotel buildings completed in 1989
Buildings and structures in Launceston, Tasmania